A2Z is a 2006 action film.

A2Z may also refer to:

A2Z Group, an electricity and waste management company
A2Z Travel, a defunct English transportation company
A2Z (Philippine TV channel), a Philippine television channel
A2Z News Alert, a Philippine television newscast broadcast by A2Z (Philippine TV channel)